Rainbow Bridge may refer to:

Bridges (man-made and natural) 
 Rainbow Bridge (Kansas), in Kansas
 Rainbow Bridge (Niagara Falls), on the United States–Canada border
 Rainbow Bridge (Texas), in southeast Texas, United States, the highest bridge in the state
 Rainbow Bridge (Tokyo), in Tokyo, Japan
 Rainbow Bridge (La Conner, Washington), connects Fidalgo Island and La Conner, crossing Swinomish Channel in Skagit County, Washington
 Rainbow Bridge, Oxford, in Oxford, England
 Rainbow Bridge, Haleiwa, Hawaii
 Rainbow Bridge, a 12th-century Chinese camelback bridge depicted in the Qingming Scroll
 Medley Footbridge, sometimes called Rainbow Bridge
 Rainbow Bridge National Monument, a natural rock formation located in Utah, United States

Arts and entertainment

Films
 Rainbow Bridge (1963 film), a Japanese anime film
 Rainbow Bridge (film), a 1971 film featuring the music of Jimi Hendrix

Other arts and entertainment
 Rainbow Bridge (album)(1971), a 1971 album by Jimi Hendrix
 "Rainbow Bridge" (M*A*S*H), an episode of the television series M*A*S*H

Supernatural bridges
 Bifröst, a burning, rainbow bridge that reaches from the human realm to the realm of the gods in Norse mythology
 Rainbow Bridge (pets), a concept in the pet owner community, referring to a metaphorical or mythological place where pets go upon their deaths, to be later reunited with their owners

See also 
 Marsh Rainbow Arch, a bridge design by James Barney Marsh (1856–1936) of the Marsh Engineering Company; seven of these "Rainbow Arch Bridge" crossings in various locations appear on the US National Register of Historic Places
 Rainbow Arch Bridge (disambiguation)